Pavlovac can refer to several places: 

In Bosnia and Herzegovina
Pavlovac, Banja Luka
Pavlovac, Pale
Pavlovac (fortress)

In Croatia
Pavlovac, Bjelovar-Bilogora County, a village in the Veliki Grđevac municipality
Pavlovac, Karlovac County, a suburb of Slunj
Pavlovac Vrebački, a village near Gospić

In Serbia
Pavlovac (Topola), a village in the Topola municipality
Pavlovac (Vranje), a suburb of Vranje in southern Serbia